Shanghvi is an Indian surname. Notable people with the surname include:

Dilip Shanghvi (born 1955), Indian billionaire businessman 
Siddharth Shanghvi (born 1977), Indian author 
Utpal Shanghvi
Utpal Shanghvi School in Mumbai, India

Indian surnames